Gilbert and Samuel McKown House, also known as "Marshy Dell", is a historic home located near Gerrardstown, Berkeley County, West Virginia. It is a large two story, four bay wide log dwelling.  The eastern section of the house was built by Gilbert McKown about 1774; the other section was added by his son Samuel about 1810.  Also on the property is a -story stone outbuilding.

Marshy Dell  was listed on the National Register of Historic Places in 1984.

References

Houses on the National Register of Historic Places in West Virginia
Houses completed in 1774
Houses in Berkeley County, West Virginia
National Register of Historic Places in Berkeley County, West Virginia